Francisco Luis "Louie" Alas (born October 10, 1963) is a Filipino basketball head coach. He is the former head coach of the Letran Knights in the National Collegiate Athletic Association, and Philippine Patriots in the ASEAN Basketball League. He was also a former coach of Mobiline from 2000 to 2001 in the Philippine Basketball Association.

Playing career

Alas' basketball career began in Adamson University in the University Athletic Association of the Philippines where he played for the school's team Adamson Falcons. In the PABL, he played for ESQ, Purefoods, Philips Sardines and Burger Machine.

He also used to work in the Philippine Sports Commission.

Coaching career

His first coaching job was with the Saint Francis of Assisi Baby Doves in Las Piñas. Afterwards, he moved to Las Piñas College. For a time, Alas used to be an assistant coach in Adamson University.

PBA and MBA

He had started as an assistant coach for Purefoods Corned Beef Cowboys under Eric Altamirano from 1997 to 1998. Later on, he transferred to the now-defunct Metropolitan Basketball Association.

Alas was supposed to handle another MBA team, the Batangas Blades when the PBA's Mobiline Phone Pals gave him an offer a chance to coach, and immediately took it. Prior to this, Mobiline was struggling under Eric Altamirano who have been fired together with the whole coaching staff. While in the PBA, he led the Phone Pals to its best record in the elimination phase of the Governor's Cup in 2000 and 2001 but all ended up losing in the semis. The Pop Cola Panthers was the first PBA team to offer him a coaching job but decided to stick with the Metrostars.

Controversy

However, before the 2002 season, Alas was fired from the team. According to reports, Alas angered top Mobiline officials when he chose Gilbert Demape over John Arigo as the team's top rookie draft pick. But he denied this allegation, saying that he had a series of meetings with the owners, and was given the freedom to decide on what he felt was best for the team. On December 3, 2001, Mobiline announced that Alas had stepped down as the team's head coach.

Alas was replaced by American Bill Bayno who immediately received heavy criticism from the nationalist Basketball Coaches Association of the Philippines due to his nationality.

NCAA and PBL

In 1998, Alas barged into NCAA territory with Letran. He immediately captured that year's championship trophy by sweeping the San Sebastian Stags in a best-of-three series.

In 2003, his Letran Knights will face the Stags again in the finals and once again he prevailed thanks to the heroics of Boyet Bautista, Aaron Aban and Jonathan Pinera. Right after the title win, the Knights joined the Philippine Basketball League under the name of Toyota Otis-Letran. The Knights captured the third-place trophy in the league's Unity Cup after beating defending champions Hapee Toothpaste Sparklers. In the 2006 PBL Unity Cup, he led Toyota to its first finals appearance only to lose to the Harbour Centre Portmasters in the pivotal fifth game in their best-of-5 series.

In 2005, he gave Letran its 16th NCAA Championship by beating the PCU Dolphins 2–1 in their epic championship series despite being down 0–1. They also ended the eliminations with a 13–1 win–loss card which is their best record since 1950.

In 2007, he suffered his very first NCAA championship loss in the hands of the San Beda Red Lions who swept them in two games. during the championship series, basketball analysts were very aware of his coaching mystique that some believed he can pull off an upset against the mighty Red Lions.

Philippine youth and senior national team

He made his coaching debut in the national team by assisting San Beda College High School coach Ato Badolato in the SEABA Jrs in 1996. The team was led by Ren-Ren Ritualo and Aries Dimaunahan. A year later, he was named coach of the youth team and formed a formidable lineup composed of future basketball stars like Kerby Raymundo, Enrico Villanueva, Cyrus Baguio, Yancy de Ocampo and others. The team won the SEABA Championship and placed third in the ABC Juniors Championship.

After his stint with the youth, he was tasked to coach the Philippines in the 1999 Southeast Asian Games in Brunei. Majority of his players were from his MBA team, the Manila Metrostars because prior to the competition, the Metrostars were the top-seeded team in that season. He led the Philippines to a gold medal by sweeping the whole tournament and beating Thailand in the Gold Medal Match.

In December 2007, he helped the Philippines win another gold medal in the 2007 Southeast Asian Games in Ratchaburi, Thailand. This time though, he was an assistant coach to Junel Baculi.

Personal life
Alas hails from the fishing town of Unisan, Quezon, and is the seventh of eight children. His younger brother Carmelo is one of his assistant coaches.

He is married to Liza Alas (née Platón), a hotel manager and has four sons: Kristoffer Louie, Kevin, Kenneth, and Kieffer, all of whom are inclined towards basketball. Kenneth is currently enrolled in Far Eastern University while Kristoffer and Kevin formerly played for the Letran Knights. Kevin is currently signed to the Philippine Basketball Association's NLEX Road Warriors.

Historian Pepe Alas is a nephew of his, a son of his elder brother Josefino.

Coaching profile

He is known to nicknames such as "Coach A" or "The Ace Coach". He has a reputation of being a very good motivator and a certified winner. So far he has tallied a total of 220 wins and 120 losses with a .647 winning percentage.

Some of his coaching idols are Larry Brown, Phil Jackson, Dean Smith, John Wooden, and Mike Krzyzewski.

He also has the ability to transform a weak team to a championship contender and turning unknown or under the radar players into stars. His players from Letran that went up to the pros are the best example of that. In 2007, his Letran team, despite undergoing a three-year rebuilding stage, surprisingly made it to the finals only to lose to the San Beda Red Lions, but the team were adored by showing their winning attitude despite being a rebuilding team. He only missed the NCAA Final Four twice (2002 and 2010).

As a coach, he specializes on defense which is the important key in winning a championship. He became the first non-Letran graduate coach in school history to give Letran at least 3 championships (1998, 2003, and 2005) and 10 Final Four appearances.

Coaching record

Collegiate record

ABL

PBA

References 

1963 births
Living people
Sportspeople from Quezon
TNT Tropang Giga coaches
Filipino men's basketball coaches
Filipino men's basketball players
Filipino people of Spanish descent
Philippines men's national basketball team coaches
Adamson Soaring Falcons basketball players
Basketball players from Quezon
ASEAN Basketball League coaches
Tagalog people
Magnolia Hotshots draft picks
Letran Knights basketball coaches
Phoenix Super LPG Fuel Masters coaches
Alaska Aces (PBA) coaches
Magnolia Hotshots coaches